Arthur Frederick Reginald Wiggins (4 December 1891 – 23 July 1961) was a British rower who competed in the 1912 Summer Olympics.

Wiggins was born in Bournemouth. He was educated at New College, Oxford. In 1912 he was a member of the Oxford Boat in the Boat Race. He was then a crew member of the New College eight which won the silver medal for Great Britain rowing at the 1912 Summer Olympics. Wiggins rowed for Oxford again in the Boat Race in 1913 and 1914.

See also
List of Oxford University Boat Race crews

References

External links
Arthur Wiggins' profile at databaseOlympics
Arthur Wiggins' obituary

1891 births
1961 deaths
Alumni of New College, Oxford
British male rowers
Olympic rowers of Great Britain
Rowers at the 1912 Summer Olympics
Olympic silver medallists for Great Britain
Stewards of Henley Royal Regatta
Olympic medalists in rowing
Medalists at the 1912 Summer Olympics
Sportspeople from Bournemouth